Ialtris dorsalis, the Hispaniolan W-headed racer or brown fanged snake, is a species of snake in the family Colubridae.  The species is native to the Dominican Republic.

References

Ialtris
Endemic fauna of the Dominican Republic
Reptiles of the Dominican Republic
Taxa named by Albert Günther
Reptiles described in 1858